The Abdul Wali Khan University Mardan (AWKUM) is a public university located in Mardan, Khyber-Pakhtunkhwa, Pakistan. Established in April 2009, the university is named after Abdul Wali Khan, a prominent  personality  of Pashtunkhwa and has forty nine institutions affiliated to it. The university started in an already-built postgraduate college of Mardan, has nine campuses and more than ten thousand students enrolled in thirty one disciplines as of 2015. The campus at Swabi was opened in October 2010 in the Anbar elementary college building and has since then become the University of Swabi and the Palosa campus is home to Bacha Khan University. Currently the university has five faculties and three constituent colleges. The faculties are Faculty of Arts & Humanities, Faculty of Chemical and Life Sciences, Faculty of Physical & Numerical Sciences, Faculty of  Economics & Business, Faculty of Social Sciences. The Pashtunkhwa College of Art, Womans' College and the Animal Husbandry and Veterinary College are also constituent colleges of the university.

Faculties and departments
Abdul Wali Khan University consists of six faculties, which have the following departments:

Faculty of Arts & Humanities 
 English	                        
 Pakhtunkhwa College of Arts	                        
 Islamic Studies	             
 Pashto
 Museum

Faculty Agriculture 
 Agriculture

Faculty of Business & Economics 
 Economics
 Institute of Business Studies and Leadership
 Management Sciences
 Museum
 Tourism & Hospitality

Faculty of Chemical & Life Sciences 
 Biochemistry
 Biotechnology
 Botany
 Chemistry
 College of Animal Husbandry & Veterinary Sciences
 Environmental Sciences
 Microbiology
 Pharmacy
 Zoology

Faculty of Technologies & Engineering Sciences 
 Computer Science
 Mathematics

Faculty of Numerical and Physical Sciences
 Physics
 Statistics
 Geology

Faculty of Social Sciences 
 Education
 International Relations (IR)
 Political Science
 Physical Education & Sports
 Journalism & Mass Communication
 Law
 Pakistan Studies
 Psychology
 Sociology

University Institutes and Colleges 

 Institute of Business Studies and Leadership
 University College for Women
 Pakhtunkhwa College of Arts 
 College of Animal Husbandry & Veterinary Sciences

Campuses and libraries 

The university has several campuses, each with library facilities: 
Main Campus—Central Library
Garden Campus
Pabbi Campus
Palosa Campus
Riffat Mahal Campus
Shankar Campus

There is also a digital library serving all campuses.

University College of Science, Shankar 
The University College of Science, Shankar has departments of Chemistry and Computer Science. University College of Science, Shankar, is housed in a 12.5-acre complex with state-of-the-art research laboratories. It has full-fledged working laboratories in physical chemistry, organic chemistry, inorganic chemistry, analytical chemistry and computer science. A video lecture facility is also available.

Garden Campus 
The newly constructed Garden Campus of the university is spread over on more than 2000 Kanals of land having state of the art infrastructure, well equipped laboratories, one of the biggest libraries of the region, computer labs, three hostels with a capacity of 1500 students, two on campus colleges, sports complex and many other facilities. Classes in the campus have been started.

Journals
 Tahdhīb al Afkār

Tahdhīb al Afkārbiannual is the biannual Islamic studies research journal of Abdul Wali Khan University Mardan published in three different languages English, Urdu and Arabic.
 Journal of Business and Tourism
 Pakhtunkhwa Journal of Life Science (PJLS)

Extra-curricular activities 

The university provides extra-curricular activities such as painting, articles, photography and sport. The students can participate through proper channels. The university provides facilities for many sports; they have been merged into the Department of Physical Education and Health and named as Department of Physical Education and Sports.

Academic collaborations 
Abdul Wali Khan University, Mardan establish partnerships with national as well as international
universities, associations, institutes and academies and have signed a memorandum of understanding(MOUs or MoUs) with each. The following is the list of international collaborations.

Mashal Khan incident

On 13 April 2017, Mashal Khan, a journalism student at the university, was murdered by a mob apparently including university employees and some of his fellow classmates on the false suspicion of uploading blasphemous content on the social networking site Facebook.

Vice Chancellors 
 Dr. Ihsan Ali (SI) (2009 – March 20, 2017)
 Dr. Mohammad Khurshid Khan (Sep 18, 2017 – march 20,2020)
 Dr. Zahoor-ul-Haq
(May 1, 2020–Present)

References

External links 

Educational institutions established in 2009
2009 establishments in Pakistan
Mardan
Abdul Wali Khan University Mardan
Education scandals
Mardan District